The Brazil women's national futsal team represents Brazil in international futsal competitions and is controlled by the Brazilian Futsal Confederation or Confederação Brasileira de Futebol de Salão. Brazil has played in all Women's Futsal World Tournaments and won all six tournaments.

Tournament records
*Draws include knockout matches decided on penalty kicks.
**Gold background colour indicates that the tournament was won.
***Red border colour indicates tournament was held on home soil.

AMF

Futsal Women's World Cup

FIFA

World Tournament

CONMEBOL COPA AMERICA FEMENINO FUTSAL

See also
Futsal in Brazil
Brazil national futsal team (men's national team)

References

South American women's national futsal teams
Brazil national futsal team
2000 establishments in Brazil
Futsal
National
Women's football in Brazil